Michele Serena (born 10 March 1970) is an Italian football manager, and former football defender, most recently in charge as manager of Serie C club Legnago. He usually played as a right-back, although he was capable of playing on either flank.

Playing career
Serena started his playing career with Mestre of Serie C2, then become Venezia following a merger. He was signed by Juventus in 1989, and made four league appearances with the bianconeri. He then played for Monza and Verona on single season loans, before signing for Sampdoria in 1992, where he played for three years. In 1995, he was signed by Fiorentina, and in 1998 by La Liga club Atlético Madrid, where he made 35 appearances with 3 goals during his only season with the club. During his time with the Spanish club, he gained a spot in the Italy national team, making his one and only appearance with the azzurri on 5 September 1998, in a 2–0 away win to Wales, under Dino Zoff. He then returned to Italy the following season to play for Parma, making 15 league appearances, but moved on to Inter Milan soon after, during the winter transfer market (in an exchange with Paulo Sousa). With the nerazzurri jersey, he made only 25 appearances in three seasons, mainly because of the several injuries he experienced during his years at Inter, which forced him to retire in 2003.

Coaching career

Venezia 
In 2007, he became the Venezia youth team coach, also getting involved in obtaining a coaching licence. On 11 March 2008, he was unveiled as new Venezia head coach, replacing Salvo D'Adderio. He was sacked a few months later, on 11 November, due to poor results. He was recalled in February 2009, with Venezia placed in the league bottom, and managed to bring his club out of the relegation zone.

Mantova 
This attracted interest from Serie B club Mantova, who appointed him as new boss for the 2009–10 season. Mantova finished third bottom of Serie B and were relegated. However, due to financial difficulties, their entry to Lega Pro Prima Divisione was rejected and the club folded.

Grosseto 
On 13 January 2011, Serena was appointed the manager's job at Serie B side, Grosseto, until the end of the 2010–11 season.

Spezia 
On 5 October 2011, he became the new coach of Spezia in Lega Pro Prima Divisione group A, in place of the sacked Elio Gustinetti, but on 4 January 2013 he was sacked.

Padova 
On 2 February 2014, Serena became the new coach of Padova in Serie B, in place of the sacked Bortolo Mutti.

Vicenza 
On 27 December 2018, he was appointed head coach of Vicenza in Serie C. He resigned on 24 February 2019.

Legnago 
On 27 December 2021, Serena returned into management after almost three years without a club, as the new head coach of Serie C club Legnago. He was dismissed on 28 March 2022 following a string of negative results.

Honours

Player 
Juventus
Coppa Italia: 1989–90
UEFA Cup: 1989–90

Sampdoria
Coppa Italia: 1993–94

Fiorentina
Coppa Italia: 1995–96
Supercoppa Italiana: 1996

Parma
Supercoppa Italiana: 1999

Personal life
His son Riccardo Serena is a professional footballer as well.

References

External links 
Playing career

Michele Serena at FIGC.it  

1970 births
Living people
Footballers from Venice
Italian footballers
Italian football managers
Juventus F.C. players
A.C. Monza players
Venezia F.C. players
ACF Fiorentina players
U.C. Sampdoria players
Hellas Verona F.C. players
Parma Calcio 1913 players
Inter Milan players
Atlético Madrid footballers
UEFA Cup winning players
Association football midfielders
Italy international footballers
Italy under-21 international footballers
Serie A players
Serie C players
La Liga players
Venezia F.C. managers
Mantova 1911 managers
F.C. Grosseto S.S.D. managers
Spezia Calcio managers
Calcio Padova managers
Serie B managers
Serie C managers